Zavalla Independent School District is a public school district based in Zavalla, Texas (USA).  The district covers much of the southeastern corner of Angelina County.

In 2009, the school district was rated "academically acceptable" by the Texas Education Agency.

Schools
In the 2012-2013 school year, the district had students in three schools. 
High schools
Zavalla Junior High/High School (Grades 6-12)
Elementary schools
Zavalla Elementary School (Grades PK-5).
Alternative schools
Stubblefield Learning Center (Grades 9-12)

References

External links

School districts in Angelina County, Texas